Hailstone was a town in northern Wasatch County, Utah, United States.

Description
It was submerged in 1995 by the waters of Jordanelle Reservoir along with Jordanelle and Keetley.

Originally known as Elkhorn, Hailstone was homesteaded in 1864 by William Paret Hailstone, Ann Davis Hailstone, and others. The town was a base for mining, ranching, and logging.

See also

 List of ghost towns in Utah

References

External links

Ghost towns in Utah
Populated places established in 1864
1864 establishments in Utah Territory
Ghost towns in Wasatch County, Utah